The following is a list of Roman praetors as reported by ancient sources.

A praetor in ancient Rome was a person who held an annual office below the level of a consul but who still received a grant of imperium, allowing him to command armed forces. Two praetors each year had specific duties in Rome: the praetor urbanus (who presided in civil cases between citizens) and the praetor peregrinus (who administered justice among foreigners). Unless otherwise noted all dates are reported in BC.

List of praetors of the Roman Republic

The following individuals held the position of Praetor during the Roman Republic, starting with the creation of the office in 366 BC.

4th century BC

3rd century BC

2nd century BC

1st century BC

References

Bibliography
 Broughton, T. Robert S., The Magistrates of the Roman Republic, American Philological Association (1952–1986), Volumes 1, 2, and Supplemental.
 Titus Livius Patavinus (Livy), Ab Urbe Condita (History of Rome).
 Polybius, Ἱστορίαι (The Histories).
 Valerius Maximus, Factorum ac dictorum memorabilium libri IX ("Nine books of memorable deeds and sayings".
 Zonaras, Ἐπιτομὴ Ἱστοριῶν (Extracts of History).

External links

Praetor
Praetors